Busting Visions is the second studio album from the Canadian Alternative Rock band Zeus.  On April 2, 2013, the band released a Deluxe Edition of the album, which added their 'Cover Me' EP, a collection of 7 covers by Zeus, to the end of the album.

Track listing
All songs written and composed by Zeus (Rob Drake, Carlin Nicholson, Mike O'Brien, Neil Quin) except where noted.

Personnel
 Rob Drake – Drums
 Carlin Nicholson – vocals, guitar, bass, keyboards
 Mike O'Brien – vocals, guitar, bass, keyboards
 Neil Quin - vocals, guitar, bass, keyboards

Additional musicians
 Afie Jurvanen, Taylor Knox, Jessica Grassia, Dave Azzolini, Liam Nicholson, Jason Collett, Mika Posen, Alex McMaster, and Bryden Baird
 'Love In A Game' also features voices of: Jay McCarol, Krista Nicholson, Meggy Messing, and Danielle Duval

References

2012 albums
Zeus (band) albums